A Wolf in Sheep's Clothing is an album by Josephine Foster, released in 2005. The album is irregular in that it is written in a German form known as "Lieder", or art songs.  Foster utilizes the compositions of Johannes Brahms and Franz Schubert, icons of the Romantic Era, while her lyrics are based upon the texts of writers like Johann Wolfgang von Goethe or Eduard Mörike.

Track listing

References

Josephine Foster albums
2006 albums